Michał Kłusak (born 20 July 1990) is a Polish alpine skier. He competed in the 2018 Winter Olympics.

References

1990 births
Living people
Alpine skiers at the 2018 Winter Olympics
Polish male alpine skiers
Olympic alpine skiers of Poland
Sportspeople from Zakopane
Competitors at the 2017 Winter Universiade
21st-century Polish people